Pratham is one of the largest non-governmental organisations in India. It was co-founded by Madhav Chavan and Farida Lambay . It works towards the provision of quality education to the underprivileged children in India. Established in Mumbai in 1994 to provide pre-school education to children in slums, Pratham today has interventions spread across 23 states and union territories of India   and has supporting chapters in the United States, UK, Germany, Sweden, and Australia.

Pratham's founder and Ex-CEO, Madhav Chavan, was the 2011 recipient of the Skoll Award for Social Entrepreneurship. In addition, Pratham received the 2013 BBVA Foundation Frontiers of Knowledge Award in Development Cooperation, as a result of successfully catering to the learning needs of tens of millions of disadvantaged children for over twenty years. In doing so, it has designed and implemented new methods that accelerate reading acquisition, using a grassroots approach in which pupils are grouped by actual levels and needs instead of age, while providing specific training to the teachers and volunteers recruited to its programs. In 2018, Pratham was awarded the Lui Che Woo Prize, a cross-sector innovation prize that recognizes outstanding contributions benefiting humanity. Pratham was unanimously selected in the Positive Energy category, which this year focused on the elimination of illiteracy.

History

UNICEF originally set up the Bombay Education Initiative in Mumbai to establish a tripartite-partnership between the government, corporate and civil society to improve India's primary education. This led to the formation of Pratham as an independent charity in 1995.

Pratham started by holding balwadis (pre-education classes) for children in Mumbai's slums. Volunteers were recruited to teach in spaces within communities, including temples, offices, and even people's homes. The Pratham pre-school classes multiplied and were replicated in other locations.

Mission

Pratham's mission is "Every Child in School and Learning well". By increasing the literacy levels of India's poor which account for about one third of the world's poor, Pratham aims to improve India's economic and social equality. This is carried out through the introduction of low cost education models that are sustainable and reproducible.

Work

Annual Status of Education Report (or ASER), is a household-based survey that collects information on children's schooling status and basic learning outcomes in almost every rural district in the country. The ASER survey is an enormous participatory exercise that has involved about 500 organizations and upwards of 25,000 volunteers every year since 2005. As part of the survey, estimates of children's schooling and learning status are generated at district, state and national levels. ASER is the only annual source of data on children's learning outcomes available in India today, and is often credited with changing the focus of discussions on education in India from inputs to outcomes. The ASER model has been adapted for use by fourteen other countries across three continents. These countries have organically come together to form the People's Action for Learning (PAL) Network, with a secretariat housed in Nairobi.

Read India: Despite India's educational reforms in recent years, quality education is still a concern, especially among low-income communities. Findings of ASER 2005 and 2006 revealed that 50% of children in government schools could not read, write or do basic arithmetic despite being in school for 4–5 years. Hence Read India was launched in 2007 to improve reading, writing and basic arithmetic skills of 6 to 14-year-old children and is carried out by school teachers, anganwadi workers and volunteers, whom Pratham trains. Read India has reached approximately 34 million children to date, resulting in large-scale improvements in literacy levels across several states in India.

Pratham Books, a non-profit organisation which publishes affordable, quality books for children, was set up in 2004 to complement Read India. It has published over 200 original titles in 10 Indian languages and reached over 14 million children.

Direct programs: Pratham's direct programs seek to supplement governmental efforts to improve quality of education through balwadis (pre-school education), learning support programs, libraries and mainstreaming drop-out children. Full-year learning support is provided at centres for children living in the immediate vicinity. These programs are typically conducted in urban slums or poor villages, where children do not have easy access to quality education.

Lakhon Mein Ek is a call-to-action campaign by Pratham Education Foundation and ASER Centre. Together with citizens from across the country, the organisation worked towards improving the status of children's learning in 100,000 villages and communities.

The campaign started on 21 October 2015 and by 11 January 2016, had reached more than 150,000 villages and communities. Furthermore, over 300,000 volunteers had joined the campaign and interacted with about 1 crore (10 million) children. By 16 January 2016, success of the campaign will be marked by citizens everywhere resolving to help children acquire basic reading and math abilities in these locations.

Vocational Training: In 2005, Pratham launched Pratham Institute, its vocational skilling arm. The objective was to train youth from economically disadvantaged backgrounds (age 18‐25 years) and provide them with employable skills, coupled with access to employment and entrepreneurship opportunities. Today Pratham Institute programs across the country enable youth to access entry-level positions and placements in 10 major vocations. Approximately 25,000 young people were reached in 2017–2018, and the youth were trained and subsequently placed in entry level jobs or helped to start their own businesses.

Other Work: Pratham has also set up other programs for disadvantaged Indian children and youth, including Pratham Council for Vulnerable Children (PCVC), Early Childhood Care and Education Centre (ECCE), and Computer-aided Literacy.

Teaching at the Right Level 
While universalizing access to schooling has been one of India's most remarkable achievements from its recent past, many children still do not acquire essential foundational skills such as reading and arithmetic at the right time, early in primary years.

While several solutions have been proposed and implemented, in a scenario wherein a significant number of children are "lagging behind", Pratham has evolved a solution called Teaching at the Right Level (TaRL) which enables children to acquire foundational skills, like reading and arithmetic quickly. Regardless of age or grade, teaching starts at the level of the child. This is what is meant by "Teaching at the Right level". The TaRL method developed by Pratham was originally designed keeping in mind children who have already reached Std. III, IV or V but still have not acquired basic skills. The focus is on helping children with basic reading, understanding, expressing themselves as well as arithmetic skills. These are foundational building blocks that help a child to move forward. Studies have shown that once acquired these capabilities endure over time. TaRL is an effective and low-cost strategy that helps children to "catch up" in a short period of time. Children, who are 7 or 8 and older and have been in school for a few years, can "pick up" quickly.

To be effective, the "Teaching at the Right Level" approach needs to be embedded in a larger eco-system whose elements are aligned to support and ensure learning for all children. Here are the main features of the school system that need to be changed to ensure that learning for all is possible.

TaRL reaches millions of children each year. It has not only been scaled to locations across India, but more recently begun to also be adapted and scaled by organizations and governments in countries in Africa, South Asia, and Latin America.

Recognition 
Pratham has been recognized internationally by prestigious awards and prominent organizations for both the quality of its innovations, as well as its extensive impact.

 Yidan Prize for Education Development to Rukmini Banerji (2021)
Lui Che Woo 2018 Prize in the Positive Energy Category for eliminating illiteracy, Hong Kong (2018)
 Medal for Distinguished Service to Madhav Chavan, Teachers College, Columbia University (2017)
 BBVA Foundation 'Frontiers of Knowledge' Award (2014)
 Recognition by the Asia Society as Asia Game Changer (2014)
 WISE Prize for Education to Madhav Chavan (2012)
 The Kravis Prize in Leadership (2010)

Further reading

 Computer Assisted Learning Project with Pratham in India Banerjee, Abhijit, Shawn Cole, Esther Duflo, and Leigh Lindon. 2007. "Remedying Education: Evidence From Randomized Experiments in India." The Quarterly Journal of Economics 122(3): 1235–1264.
 How to Teach English in India: Testing the Relative Productivity of Instruction Methods within the Pratham English Language Education Program
 Educational Incentives for Parents and Children in India Berry, James. "Child Control in Education Decisions: An Evaluation of Targeted Incentives to Learn in India." Working Paper, Cornell University, June 2011.
 Bridge Classes and Peer Networks Among Out-of-School Children in India Berry, James, and Leigh Linden. "Bridge Classes and Peer Networks among Out-of-school Children in India." Working Paper, MIT, March 2009.
 Read India: Helping Primary School Students in India Acquire Basic Reading and Math Skills
 What helps children to learn? Evaluation of Pratham's Read India program in Bihar & Uttarakhand - JPAL
 Hope Amidst Despair. An account of the lives and hopes of Pratham Children. 2006, Narain, Chetan
 Sustaining Hope. Five Years Later. An account of the lives and hopes of Pratham Children. 2011 Narain, Akshar
 3 R's and an M Teaching music in the slums of India. 2013 Narain, Akshar
 Improving Literacy and Math Instruction at Scale in India's Primary Schools: The Case of Pratham's Read India Program. 2016. Journal of Educational Change. Banerji, Rukmini and Chavan, Madhav.  
 Pratham's Read India Program - Taking Small Steps Towards Learning at Scale. 2016. Center for Universal Education at Brookings. 
 Earning the right to scale. 2019. Jonk, Kim & Meehan, William.
 Teaching at the right level: from concern with exclusion to challenges of implementation. Background paper for GEM Report 2020: Inclusion and Education. All means All. UNESCO, Paris. Banerji, Rukmini, Lakshman, Samyukta, and Agarwal, Arjun.
 Learning for All: Lessons from ASER and Pratham in India on the Role of Citizens and Communities on Improving Children's Learning. 2021. Published as a book chapter (no. 13) in the edited volume of Powering a Learning Society in an Age of disruption by the Education in the Asia-Pacific Region: Issues, Concerns and Prospects(ADB Springer). Banerji, Rukmini.

External reviews

GiveWell review

In November 2011, US-based charity evaluator GiveWell identified Pratham as one of six "standout" organisations to give to in its list of top charities. This placed Pratham below the top-ranked charities Against Malaria Foundation and Schistosomiasis Control Initiative and alongside Innovations for Poverty Action, GiveDirectly, KIPP (Houston branch), Nyaya Health, and Small Enterprise Foundation. GiveWell also lists Pratham as its top charity in the developing world education category.

GiveWell has also published a detailed review of Pratham, last updated in March 2012.

Global Education Evidence Advisory Panel recommendation 
Pratham's Teaching at the Right Level (TaRL) approach was recommended as a 'Good Buy' in the Global Education Evidence Advisory Panel (GEEAP)'s October 2020 report on Smart Buys in education for low- and middle-income countries.

References

External links
 Official site
 Pratham USA
 Pratham UK
 Pratham Sweden
 Pratham Australia
ASER Centre

Educational organisations based in India
Organisations based in Mumbai
Children's charities based in India
Children's rights organizations
1994 establishments in Maharashtra
Organizations established in 1994